Mühlhausen is a town in the district of Rhein-Neckar in Baden-Württemberg in Germany. Mühlhausen has three districts.

References

Rhein-Neckar-Kreis